Savannah Lee Smith (born July 27, 2000) is an American actress. She gained recognition due to her role as Monet De Haan in the HBO Max series, Gossip Girl.

Personal life 
Smith was born on July 27, 2000 and grew up in Los Angeles. Her father is a screenwriter, while her mother was a professional singer in the 90s. 

Smith later attended New York University’s Tisch School of the Arts. She majored in music, but transferred to drama in her first year to pursue acting in theater.

Smith is bisexual. She accidentally came out to her family during her recovery from a scoliosis surgery when she was sixteen.

Career 
Smith, who lives in New York City, auditioned for multiple roles for Gossip Girl before being cast as Monet. In November 2021, she was cast as lead in musical film Something Here.

Smith announced her new role as Clara in an undisclosed film in October 2022. The following month, Smith begins filming a Lifetime movie, Drunk, Drive, and 17, in a lead role as Kim. The film is set to air on April 15, 2023.

Filmography

Film

Television

References 

2000 births
Living people
Actresses from Los Angeles
Tisch School of the Arts alumni
American television actresses
Bisexual actresses
American LGBT actors